"Te Vas" is a 2019 song by Inna

"Te Vas" may also refer to:
 "Te Vas", a song by Héctor el Father from the album The Bad Boy, 2006
 "Te Vas", a song by Ricky Martin from the album Música + Alma + Sexo, 2011
 "Te Vas", a 2002 song by Estanis Mogollón, covered in 2008 by Américo
 "Te Vas", a 2016 song by Ozuna